Riverside Junior/Senior High School is a public high school in Boardman, Oregon, United States.

Academics
In 2008, 87% of the school's seniors received a high school diploma. Of 76 students, 66 graduated, two dropped out, and eight were still in high school the following year.

References

High schools in Morrow County, Oregon
Public middle schools in Oregon
Education in Morrow County, Oregon
Public high schools in Oregon